was a Japanese writer of short stories and novels.

Biography
Born in Hiroshima and grown up in Kanagawa Prefecture, Abe graduated from the University of Tokyo with a degree in French literature and worked as a director for Radio Tokyo (now TBS) until 1971, when he became a full-time writer.

His literary career began in 1962 with the publication of his debut work Kodomobeya (lit. "Children's room"), for which he received the Bungakukai Newcomer Award (Bungakukai shinjinshō). Most of his stories draw upon his biography and his family in a contemporary I-novel style known as "mental state novel" (shinkyō shōsetsu). Other major works include the 1970 novel Shirei no kyūka (lit. "The commander's holiday") about his military officer father, and the 1972 short story Peaches (Momo), which, like Kodomobeya, deals with personal childhood memories. He received the Mainichi Publishing Culture Award for his 1973 short story Sennen (lit. "Thousand years").

Abe died of heart failure at the age of 54. A fourteen volume edition of his collected works, Abe Akira shū, was published by Iwanami Shoten in 1991–1992.

Selected works
 1962: Kodomobeya
 1970: Shirei no kyūka
 1970: Friends (Hibi no tomo)
 1972: Peaches (Momo)
 1973: Sennen
 1976: Jinsei no ichinichi
 1982: A Napping Cove (Madoromu irie)

Translations
Of Abe's short stories, Friends, Peaches and A Napping Cove have been translated into English. The novel Shirei no kyūka has been translated into German as Urlaub für die Ewigkeit.

References

1934 births
1989 deaths
Writers from Hiroshima
University of Tokyo alumni
20th-century Japanese writers